Jules François Ringnet (24 May 1861 – 4 October 1928) was a French fencer. He competed in the men's masters foil event at the 1900 Summer Olympics.

References

External links
 

1861 births
1928 deaths
French male foil fencers
Olympic fencers of France
Fencers at the 1900 Summer Olympics
Sportspeople from Mayenne